

The following lists events that happened during 1944 in Afghanistan.

Although diplomatic relations with Germany and Japan are maintained, the relations of Afghanistan with the Allied Powers become more intimate. The country is dependent for its essential imports on India, the U.S.S.R., and the United States.

Incumbents
 Monarch – Mohammed Zahir Shah
 Prime Minister – Mohammad Hashim Khan

January 1944
Gen. Patrick J. Hurley visits Kabul as U.S. President Franklin D. Roosevelt's personal representative.

March 1944
The Afghan ambassador and Chinese minister in Ankara conclude a lengthy negotiation with the signing of a treaty of friendship establishing diplomatic and consular relations between the two countries.

References 

 
Afghanistan
Years of the 20th century in Afghanistan
Afghanistan
1940s in Afghanistan